Sefer Aycan (born March 16, 1963) is a Turkish doctor of public health, academics, ex- Undersecretary of Turkish Health Ministry and politician.

Early life and education
Aycan was born in Kahramanmaraş. He completed his primary and secondary education in Kahramanmaraş Province.

Personal life 
He married with Zehra Aycan (teacher at Yıldırım Beyazıt University graduated from Gazi University)  in 1991. They have two(Çağrı and Gökalp) children.

Education and career 
 1989 Gazi University Faculty of Medicine Public Health Master of Science (M.S.)
 1990 Gazi University Faculty of Medicine Public Health Lecturer
 1995 Gazi University Faculty of Medicine Public Health Assistant Professor
 1997 Gazi University Faculty of Medicine Public Health Associate Professor
 1999 - 2001 Health Ministry of Turkey Primary Health Care General Manager
 2001 - 2002  Health Ministry of Turkey Undersecretary
 2004 Gazi University Faculty of Medicine Public Health Professor
 2009 Gazi University Faculty of Medicine Public Health Head of Division

Political career 
Aycan was selected from Kahramanmaraş as a Member of Turkish Parliament (representative of MHP) in the June 2015 Turkish general election.

References

External links
 http://www.seferaycan.com
 http://websitem.gazi.edu.tr/site/saycan

1963 births
Living people